Platyosphys is a genus of basilosaurid from Middle Eocene (Bartonian) of the eastern United States and Ukraine.

Taxonomy
The type species, Platyosphys paulsoni, was originally described as Zeuglodon paulsoni in 1873 on the basis of several vertebrae from a Bartonian-age horizon in southern Ukraine. In his 1936 monograph regarding Archaeoceti, Remington Kellogg recognized the distinct nature of the taxon and coined the new genus Platyosphys for Z. paulsoni. Another new species of Platyosphys, P. einori, was coined for vertebrae, a scapula, and rib fragments in 2001.

In the original description of Basilotritus, Platyosphys and its constituent species were considered nomina dubia because their material was considered insufficiently diagnostic to generic or specific level. However, a 2015 paper describing archaeocetes from the Western Sahara described a new species, P. aithai, and reiterated the diagnostic nature of the type species of Platyosphys, suggesting that Basilotritus might be a synonym of Platyosphys.   Platosphys aithai was renamed Antaecetus by Gingerich et al. (2022), who also made Pachycetus robustus a junior synonym of paulsonii along with Platyosphys einori to create the new combination Pachycetus paulsonii, making paulsonii the epithet of the Pachycetus type species.

References 

Basilosauridae
Fossil taxa described in 1936
Prehistoric cetacean genera
Eocene mammals of Europe
Eocene mammals of North America